Phytoecia merkli is a species of beetle in the family Cerambycidae. It was described by Ganglbauer in 1884. It is known from Turkey, Armenia and Jordan. It contains the varietas Phytoecia merkli var. inapicalis.

References

Phytoecia
Beetles described in 1884